Pop art is a visual art movement that emerged in the 1950s in Britain and the United States.

Pop art may also refer to:
PopArt: Pet Shop Boys – The Hits, an album by the UK electronic music duo Pet Shop Boys
Pop Art (album), the debut album from UK pop/rock band Transvision Vamp
Pop Art (short story), a short story by an American author, Joe Hill
Pop Art, the debut album by UK pop musician MPHO
Pop Art, Inc., an American interactive marketing agency

See also

Art pop (disambiguation)
Pop Hart (George Overbury Hart), 1868–1933, American painter